Rebecca Tegg (born 18 December 1985) is an association football player who represented New Zealand at international level.

Tegg made her full Football Ferns debut in a 0–3 loss to Australia on 19 July 2007, and represented New Zealand at the 2007 FIFA Women's World Cup finals in China, where they lost to Brazil 0–5, Denmark (0-2) and China (0-2).

Tegg was also included in the New Zealand squad for the 2008 Summer Olympics where they drew with Japan (2-2) before losing to Norway (0-1) and Brazil (0-4).

Tegg formally played for Melbourne Victory in the Australian W-League.

References

External links
 

1985 births
Living people
New Zealand women's association footballers
New Zealand women's international footballers
Olympic association footballers of New Zealand
Footballers at the 2008 Summer Olympics
Melbourne Victory FC (A-League Women) players
Women's association football forwards
2007 FIFA Women's World Cup players